This is a list of wars involving Mauritania.

See also 
Military of Mauritania
2005 Mauritanian coup d'état
2008 Mauritanian coup d'état

References

Citations

Bibliography 

Mauritania

Wars